Kudoa is a genus of Myxozoa and the only genus recognized within the monotypic family Kudoidae. There are approximately 100 species of Kudoa all of which parasitize on marine and estuarine fish. Kudoa are most commonly known and studied for the negative effects the genus has on commercial fishing and aquaculture industries.

Description 
The genus Kudoa is identified by the possession of four or more shell valves composed of a fragile membrane and arranged in a quadrate or stellate pattern. The maximum number of shell valves in any described Kudoa species is 13. Each of these valves has a polar capsule. The genus Kudoa was originally part of the genus Chloromyxum because of the distribution of their polar capsules, however, it was later determined to be a separate genus. Each Kudoa has two sporoplasm cells, one enclosed by the other. Most  Kudoa are histozoic parasites, with a few species being described as coelzoic. Some taxonomists question whether these coelzoic organisms belong to a separate genus. There are approximately 100 described species of Kudoa which can be found in the Atlantic, Pacific, and Indian oceans.

Species

The following species are recognized in the genus Kudoa:

 Kudoa aequidens Casal, Matos, Matos & Azevedo, 2008
 Kudoa akihitoi Kasai, Setsuda & Sato, 2017
 Kudoa alliaria Kovaleva, Shulman & Yakolev, 1979
 Kudoa amamiensis Egusa & Nakajima, 1978
 Kudoa azoni Aseeva, 2004
 Kudoa barracudai Abdel-Baki, Al-Quraishy, Omar & Mansour, 2016
 Kudoa boopsi Kpatcha, Diebakate, Faye & Toguebaye, 1999
 Kudoa bora (Fujita, 1930)
 Kudoa camarguensis Pampoulie, Marques, Crivelli & Boucherau, 1999
 Kudoa cascasia Sarkar & Chaudry, 1996
 Kudoa caudata Kovaleva & Gaevskaya, 1983
 Kudoa chaetodoni Burger, Cribb & Adlard, 2007
 Kudoa chilkaensis Tripathi, 1951
 Kudoa ciliatae Lom, Rohde & Dyková, 1992
 Kudoa clupeidae (Hahn, 1917)
 Kudoa crumena Iversen & van Meter, 1967
 Kudoa cynoglossi Obiekezie & Lick, 1994
 Kudoa dianae Dyková, Fajer & Fiala, 2002
 Kudoa empressmichikoae Kasai, Setsuda & Sato, 2017
 Kudoa funduli Hahn, 1915
 Kudoa grammatorcyni Adlard, Bryant, Whipps & Kent, 2005
 Kudoa hexapunctata Yokoyama, Suzuki & Shirakashi, 2014
 Kudoa histolytica (Pérard, 1928)
 Kudoa hypoepicardialis Blaylock, Bullard & Whipps, 2004
 Kudoa inornata Dykova, de Buron, Fiala, Roumillat, 2009
 Kudoa insolita Shulman & Kovalijova, 1979
 Kudoa intestinalis Maeno, Magasawa & Sorimachi, 1993
 Kudoa islandica Kristmundsson & Freeman, 2014
 Kudoa iwatai Egusa & Shiomitsu, 1983
 Kudoa kabatai Shulman & Kovalijova, 1979
 Kudoa kenti Burger & Adlard, 2009
 Kudoa lateolabracis Yokoyama, Whipps, Kent, Mizuno & Kawakami, 2004
 Kudoa leiostomi Dyková, Lom & Overstreet, 1994
 Kudoa lemniscati Miller & Adlard, 2012
 Kudoa leptacanthae Heiniger & Adlard, 2012
 Kudoa lethrini Burger, Cribb & Adlard, 2007
 Kudoa lunata Lom, Dyková & Lhotákova, 1983
 Kudoa lutjanus Wang, Huang, Tsai, Cheng, Tsai, Chen, Chen, Chiu, Liaw, Chang & Chen, 2005
 Kudoa megacapsula Yokoyama & Itoh, 2005
 Kudoa miniauriculata Whitaker, Kent & Sakanari, 1996
 Kudoa minithyrsites Whipps, Adlard, Bryant, Lester, Findlay & Kent, 2003
 Kudoa mirabilis Naidenova & Gaevskaya, 1991
 Kudoa monodactyli Gunter, Cribb, Whipps & Adlard, 2006
 Kudoa muscularis (Cheung, Nigrellu & Ruggieri, 1983)
 Kudoa musculoliquefaciens (Matsumoto & Arai, 1954)
 Kudoa neothunni (Arai & Matsumoto, 1953)
 Kudoa nova Naidenova, 1975
 Kudoa obicularis Azevedo, Rocha, Matos, Oliveira, Matos, Al-Quraishy & Casal, 2015
 Kudoa ovivora Swearer & Robertson, 1999
 Kudoa paniformis Kabata & Whitaker, 1981
 Kudoa paralichtys Cho & Kim, 2003
 Kudoa paraquadricornis Burger & Adlard, 2009
 Kudoa parathyrsites Kasai, Li, Mafie & Sato, 2016
 Kudoa pericardialis Nakajima & Egusa, 1978
 Kudoa permulticapsula Whipps, Adlard, Bryant & Kent, 2003
 Kudoa quadratum (Thélohan, 1895)
 Kudoa quadricornis Whipps, Adlard, Bryant & Kent, 2003
 Kudoa rosenbuschi (Gelormini, 1966)
 Kudoa sciaenae Teran, Llicán & Lugue, 1990
 Kudoa septempunctata
 Kudoa scomberomori Adlard, Bryant, Whipps & Kent, 2005
 Kudoa sebastea Aseeva, 2004
 Kudoa shkae Dyková, Lom & Overstreet, 1994
 Kudoa sphyraeni Narasimhamurti & Kalavati, 1979
 Kudoa stellula Yurakhno, 1991
 Kudoa tachysurae Sarkar & Mazumder, 1983
 Kudoa tetraspora Narasimhamurti & Kalavati, 1979
 Kudoa thalassomi Adlard, Bryant, Whipps & Kent, 2005
 Kudoa thyrsites (Gilchrist, 1924)
Kudoa thunni (Matsukane, Sato, Tanaka, Kamata & Sugita-Konishi, 2011)

Five additional species have been proposed, but are not yet widely recognized:

 Kudoa azevedoi Mansour, Thabet, Chourabi, Harrath, Gtari, Omar & Hassine, 2013
 Kudoa cheilodipteri Heiniger, Cribb & Adlard, 2013
 Kudoa cookii Heiniger, Cribb & Adlard, 2013
 Kudoa gunterae Burger & Adlard, 2009
 Kudoa whippsi Burger & Adlard, 2009

Development 

In Myxozoan development, the Myxosporean life-stage develops inside a fish host, while the Actinosporean life-stage develops in an annelid host. Fully-developed Myxospores are consumed by annelids and reproduce asexually via schzogony in the gut epithelium of worms. Gametes are formed in the gut of the worm and these gametes fuse together to create eight zygotes. The zygotes become spores with three valves, 3 polar capsules, and a sporoplasm that are released in the worm's feces and attach to the surface of a fish host. Once attached to the fish, the gamete injects the sporoplasm cell into the fish. The sporoplast divides forming a fully-developed Myxosporean.

Diet 
Kudoa parasitize on marine and estuarine fish. Kudoa typically feed on the skeletal muscle tissue, although some may feed on other parts of the body such as the central nervous system, heart, intestines, ovaries, or gills. Most Kudoa are histozoic parasites, however, a few species are coelzoic. The genus Kudoa attack a wide range of hosts, however, individual species only feed on specific hosts. Kudoa feed via pinocytosis across the host-parasite membrane. One species of  Kudoa, K. thyrsites, are distributed worldwide and are believed to have been reported in over 20 different species of fish but it is possible that the species described as K. thyrsites is actually multiple different species.

Implications for the fishing industry 
Kudoa are most well-known for the economic loss they cause for the commercial fishing and aquaculture industries. When Kudoa attach to hosts, they leave unsightly cysts that lower the price fish can be sold for at market. Kudoa also release proteolytic enzymes that degenerate muscle in fish to aid in their own growth and development, further decreasing the fish's value. Some species in the genus Kudoa with the most notable effects of the commercial fishing and aquaculture industries are: K. musculoliquefaciens in Broadbill Swordfish (Xiphias gladius), K. thyrsites in Atlantic Salmon (Salmo salar), K. clupeidae in Atlantic Herring (Clupea harengus), K. septempunctata in Olive Flounder (Paralichthys olivaceus), K. thunni in Yellowfin Tuna (Thunnus albacares) and K. paniformis in Pacific Hake (Merluccius productus).

Some studies have found evidence to suggest that some species of Kudoa are linked to food-borne illness in humans.

References 
Encyclopedia of Life

Kudoidae
Cnidarian genera